Obyce is a village and municipality in Zlaté Moravce District of the Nitra Region, in western-central Slovakia.

History
In historical records the village was first mentioned in 1332.

Geography
The municipality lies at an altitude of 248 metres and covers an area of 31.27 km². It has a population of about 1560 people.

References

External links
Official website of the municipality of Obyce
http://www.e-obce.sk/obec/obyce/obyce.html

Villages and municipalities in Zlaté Moravce District